The P-500 Bazalt is a turbojet-powered, supersonic cruise missile used by the Soviet and Russian navies. Its GRAU designation is 4K80 and its NATO reporting name is SS-N-12 Sandbox, its upgraded version being the P-1000 Vulkan AShM SLCM.

History

Developed by OKB-52 MAP (later NPO Mashinostroyeniye), it entered service to replace the SS-N-3 Shaddock. A version of the P-500 Bazalt with improved guidance and engines is used on the s. The sixteen launchers dominate the decks of the class.

Description
The P-500 Bazalt has a 550 km range and a payload of 1,000 kg, which allows it to carry a 350 kt nuclear or a 950 kg semi-armor-piercing high-explosive warhead. The P-500 Bazalt uses active radar homing for terminal guidance, and can receive mid-course correction from the Tupolev Tu-95RTs Bear D, the Kamov Ka-25K Hormone B and the Kamov Ka-31.

The missiles were intended to be used in salvos – a submarine could launch eight in rapid succession, maintaining control of each through a separate datalink. In flight the group could co-ordinate their actions. One would fly to a higher altitude and use its active radar to search for targets, forwarding this data to the other missiles which remained at low altitude.

The missiles were programmed so that half of a salvo would head for a carrier target, with the rest dividing between other ships. If the high-flying missile was shot down, another from the salvo would automatically pop up to take its place. All of the missiles would switch to active radar for the terminal phase of the attack.

P-1000 Vulkan

An improved version of the P-500 was installed on three Echo II submarines towards the end of the Cold War. The P-1000 Vulkan (GRAU 3M70) presumably has the same firing range and maximum speed with the P-500 Bazalt (range 800 km). The missile weight was increased by 1–2 tons. The missile has a turbojet engine and a starting powder accelerator. High-altitude flight regimes are presumably the same as that of the P-500.

The P-1000 was ordered on 15 May 1979 from NPO Mashinostroyeniya Chelomey. It first flew in July 1982 and was accepted for service on 18 December 1987. It was installed on three Echo II submarines of the Northern Fleet between 1987 and 1993. The conversion of two units of the Pacific Fleet, the K-10 and K-34, was abandoned due to lack of funds. 

Of the submarines that did receive the P-1000, the K-1 was decommissioned after a reactor accident in 1989, the K-35 was stricken in 1993 and the K-22 in 1995. The P-1000 has been installed on the Slava-class cruiser Varyag, and some sources reported P-1000 missiles on her sister ship Moskva.

Related developments
The P-700 Granit (NATO reporting name SS-N-19 Shipwreck) was partially based on the SS-N-12, but with a significantly modified airframe. The avionics, however, are very similar.

Operators
Current

Russian Navy

Former

Soviet Navy

See also
Operation Ivy Bells

References

External links

MARITIME STRIKE The Soviet Perspective
Russian/Sovjet P-500 Bazalt Page (with photos)
Russian/Sovjet Sea-based Anti-Ship Missiles

Weapons of Russia
 
P-500
P-500
Cruise missiles of the Cold War
Nuclear missiles of the Cold War
P-500
Surface-to-surface missiles
Nuclear cruise missiles of Russia
Cruise missiles of Russia
Submarine-launched cruise missiles of Russia
NPO Mashinostroyeniya products
Military equipment introduced in the 1970s